This is a list of things named after Sheikh Hasina, current Prime Minister of Bangladesh and longest serving prime minister in the history of Bangladesh. This list includes proposed name changes.

Agencies
 Sheikh Hasina National Youth Center
 Sheikh Hasina Software & Technology Park
 Sheikh Hasina National Institute of Burn and Plastic Surgery

Objects
 BNS Sheikh Hasina, Navy ship

Buildings
 Sheikh Hasina International Cricket Stadium in Dhaka
 Sheikh Hasina Cultural Village, Jamalpur

Bridges
 Gangachara Sheikh Hasina Bridge, a bridge over Teesta River
 Sheikh Hasina Bridge, a bridge over Mahananda River.
 Sheikh Hasina Bridge, a bridge over Madhumati River.
 Sheikh Hasina Bridge, a bridge over Meghna River.
 Sheikh Hasina Bridge, a bridge over Dhaleshwari River.

Educational institutions

University
 Sheikh Hasina University in Netrokona
 Sheikh Hasina Agriculture Institute, Faculty Of Agriculture, BSMRSTU
 Sheikh Hasina Medical University, Khulna

Student Hostel 
 Jononetri Sheikh Hasina Hall, University of Chittagong
 Sheikh Hasina Hall, Jahangirnagar University
 Krishakratna Sheikh Hasina Hall, Sher-e-Bangla Agricultural University
 Sheikh Hasina Hall, BUTEX
 Sheikh Hasina Hall, University of Barisal
 Deshratno Sheikh Hasina Hall, Islamic University, Bangladesh
 Sheikh Hasina Hall, Pabna University of Science and Technology
 Sheikh Hasina Hall, Jessore University of Science and Technology
 Deshratna Sheikh Hasina Hall, Rajshahi University of Engineering and Technology
 Sheikh Hasina Hall, Begum Rokeya University

Colleges
 Sheikh Hasina Medical College in Jamalpur District
 Sheikh Hasina Medical College in Tangail District
 Sheikh Hasina Medical College in Habiganj District
 Sheikh Hasina Govt. Girls' High School and College, Gopalganj
 Sheikh Hasina Padma Pukur Degree College, Jhenaidah
 Sheikh Hasina Academy & Women's College, Madaripur
 Sheikh Hasina Academy, Pirojpur

Streets
 Sheikh Hasina highway, Madaripur-Shariatpur
 Sheikh Hasina Road, Chittagong.

Flora
 Dendrobium Sheikh Hasina, a types of Orchid in Singapore Botanic Gardens

See also
 Sheikh–Wazed family
 List of things named after Sheikh Mujibur Rahman
 List of things named after Kazi Nazrul Islam

References

Sheikh Hasina
Hasina, Sheikh